Not the Same may refer to:

 "Not the Same" (song), a song by Sheldon Riley and Australia's entrant for the Eurovision Song Contest 2022
 "Not the Same", a song by Dinosaur Jr. from their 1993 album Where You Been
 "Not the Same", a song by Ben Folds from his 2001 album Rockin' the Suburbs
 "Not the Same", a song by Bodyjar from their album How It Works, and later featured in Tony Hawk's Pro Skater 3.
 "Not the Same", a song by Crystal Lewis from her 1998 album Gold
 "Not the Same", a song by Days Of The New from their 1999 album